Asphodeline lutea (king's spear, yellow asphodel) is a perennial plant native to southeastern Europe, northern Africa, the Caucasus and the Levant. It is grown as a landscaping plant.

It has been associated with the Asphodel of the underworld, but see also the closely related Asphodelus ramosus.

Description

History
Asphodeline lutea was introduced into the University of Oxford Botanic Garden in 1648, even though it demonstrated no known uses that are typical of a physic garden (plants grown for medicinal use). One of the curators of the garden at the time, John Parkinson, said the plant was "not... used in Physicke for any purpose." The locals in the Mediterranean  who were interviewed by Parkinson said that that plant had "no... propertie appropriate unto it but knavery," with no explanation of the particular knavery of which the plant was guilty. The description in the Botanic Garden used the old name of Asphodelus lutea.

References

External links 
Kew Plants of the World Online
IPNI Listing

Asphodeloideae
Plants described in 1753
Taxa named by Carl Linnaeus
Garden plants